Büğdüz can refer to the following places in Turkey:

 Büğdüz, Akyurt
 Büğdüz, Çorum
 Büğdüz, Orta